The Edmonton Rush are a lacrosse team based in Edmonton playing in the National Lacrosse League (NLL). The 2012 season was the 7th in franchise history. The Rush had a tough regular season, starting 2-7 before gaining momentum in the second half. They finished 6-10 but made the playoffs. In the playoffs, however, everything changed as the Rush beat both the Calgary Roughnecks and Minnesota Swarm in dominating performances, before losing to the Rochester Knighthawks 9-6 in the championship game.

The Rush made a number of significant moves in the off-season, most notably trading captain Brodie Merrill, Dean Hill, and Mike McLellan to Philadelphia for Athan Iannucci, Alex Turner, and Brodie McDonald as well as first-round draft picks in three future drafts. They also picked up Kyle Rubisch and Ryan Dilks from the Boston Blazers dispersal draft, and Shawn Williams, Aaron Wilson, Chris Corbeil, Aaron Bold, and Kevin Croswell in other trades. This is also the first out 6 consecutive seasons in the playoffs.

Regular season

Conference standings

Game log
Reference:

Playoffs

Game log
Reference:

Transactions

Trades

*Later traded to the Buffalo Bandits
**Later traded to the Minnesota Swarm
***Later traded to the Washington Stealth
****Later traded to the Calgary Roughnecks

Dispersal Draft
The Rush chose the following players in the Boston Blazers dispersal draft:

Entry Draft
The 2011 NLL Entry Draft took place on September 21, 2011. The Rush drafted the following player:

Roster

See also
2012 NLL season

References

2012 in lacrosse
Edmonton Rush seasons